ASA "Yaron" Tel Aviv, is an Israeli amateur rugby club based in Tel Aviv. 14 Times league champion

History
Founded in 1973, they are members of Rugby Israel and play home matches at the Sportech.

ASA "Yaron" Tel Aviv won the league title 14 times since. In 1974–75, 1977–78, 1990–1991, 1994–95, 1996–97, 1999–00, 2000–01, 2003–04, 2009–10, 2013–14, 2014–15, 2018-19
In 2009-10 the club also won the cup, and were undefeated all season. 
Club coach Ra'anan Penn assisted by Mark Goldin.

The club's women's team also won the local championship in 2009–10.

Name Change/Dedication

In 2020 the club officially added Yaron to its name in honor of the late Yaron Drori who was the captain of the team for about 20 years.

Honours
 Israeli Rugby Union Championship
 2010
 Israeli Rugby Union Cup
 2010

Current squad

References

External links

Rugby clubs established in 1973
Israeli rugby union teams
Sport in Tel Aviv
Tel Aviv University